This is a list of all tornadoes that were confirmed by local offices of the National Weather Service in the United States from January to March 2014.

United States yearly total

January

January 11 event

February

February 20 event

February 21 event

February 28 event

March

March 1 event

March 6 event

March 25 event

March 26 event

March 27 event

March 28 event

March 29 event

March 31 event

See also
Tornadoes of 2014

Notes

References

Tornadoes of 2014
2014, 01
January 2014 events in the United States
February 2014 events in the United States
March 2014 events in the United States